NK Kurilovec are a football team from Velika Gorica currently playing in the Treća HNL.

Kurilovec changed their name from NK Udarnik Kurilovec in 2018 after the town of Kurilovec became a part of Velika Gorica.

Udarnik were promoted to the Croatian third league in 2017 after winning the 4th division title by ten points. It is their second appearance in the third division.

They appeared in the 2003-04 Croatian Cup, losing in the preliminary round.

The club has a football school for children. They organise the Alpas Cup for under-11s, which features teams from all over Europe.

Current squad

Personnel

References

Football clubs in Croatia
Association football clubs established in 1948
1948 establishments in Croatia
Kurilovec